Chun Yang-hsi is a Taiwanese taekwondo practitioner. She won a bronze medal in heavyweight at the 1989 World Taekwondo Championships in Seoul, after being defeated by Jung Wan-sook in the semi final. She also competed at the 1991 World Taekwondo Championships in Athens, where she reached the quarter final.

References

External links

Year of birth missing (living people) 
Living people
Taiwanese female taekwondo practitioners
World Taekwondo Championships medalists
20th-century Taiwanese women